Umar Abdullah el-Muhayshi (1941 – January, 1984), also transliterated as Omar al-Meheshi, was a Libyan army officer and a member of the Libyan Revolutionary Command Council that ruled Libya after the 1969 Libyan coup d'état.

Life
Born to a family of Circassian and Turkish origin, Umar Muhayshi was said to be a childhood friend of Muammar Gaddafi and later a member of the group of army officers called the Free Officers Movement that brought the royal regime in Libya down on 1 September 1969. He became a member of the twelve-member Libyan Revolutionary Command Council, headed by Muammar Gaddafi. He was promoted to the rank of Major after the revolution. After the establishment of the Libyan People's Court in October 1969, he represented the attorney-general at the court. He later was appointed Minister of Planning and took issue with Gaddafi's wasting of Libyan resources on pan-Arab and anti-colonialist causes. Instead, he wanted Libya to invest its oil revenues in agriculture and industry, particularly heavy industries, such as iron and steel, in his hometown Misrata.

In August 1975, Gaddafi's regime announced that an attempted coup d'état had been forestalled. All thirteen leading conspirators were members of the Free Officers Movement and four of them (Muhayshi, Bashir Houadi, Abdul Munim el Houni and Awad Hamza) were members of Revolutionary Council. By that time Muhayshi had already fled to Tunis. Most of the other supposed conspirators were executed in March 1976. In an interview with Al-Ahram, Muhayshi denied attempting a coup and stated that he had merely tried to "correct Gaddafi's error" and had asked Gaddafi to resign. In the same interview, Muhayshi referred to Gaddafi as a "dangerous psychopath."

According to declassified diplomatic telegram sent from the US Embassy in Egypt to the State Department, Egyptian President Anwar Sadat was using Muhayshi's radio broadcast to discredit Gaddafi and most of Gaddafi's Revolutionary Command Council (with the exception of Abdessalam Jalloud) had turned against him by 1976. In light of this development, Sadat's government considered several options: forming a Libyan government-in-exile headed by Muhayshi, using Saudi money to fund anti-Gaddafi dissidents inside Libya, or creating a Muhayshi-led government on Libyan territory (near the Libya-Egypt border), where Muhayshi could then appeal for an Egyptian "intervention" to remove Gaddafi by force either through arrest or assassination.

Between 1976 and 1983, Muhayshi lived in Egypt, Tunisia and Morocco. While he was in Egypt, some sources said that Gaddafi's regime tried in vain to assassinate Muhayshi more than once. Most notably, Gaddafi allegedly offered ex-CIA officers Edwin P. Wilson and Frank Terpil $1 million in 1976 to recruit a group of Cuban exiles involved in Bay of Pigs Invasion to assassinate Muhayshi. The Cuban exiles initially thought the target of the assassination would be Carlos the Jackal, then living in Libya under Gaddafi's protection, and they refused to partake in the plot when the target turned out to be Muhayshi. Wilson was sentenced to 32 years in prison over his ties to Gaddafi, but was acquitted in 1983 on the counts of murder conspiracy and conspiracy to solicit murder in the Muhayshi case. Terpil never stood trial as he remained a fugitive for the rest of his life.

Muhayshi remained in Cairo until President Anwar Sadat announced his intention to visit Jerusalem in 1979, which Major Omar al-Muhaishi publicly and vehemently opposed, resulting in the freezing of his activities and even with his expulsion from Egypt to Morocco in July 1980. 

In 1983, while Muhayshi was in Morocco, then under King Hassan II, the Moroccan authorities delivered Muhayshi to Gaddafi in exchange of Gaddafi promising to cut off financial aid to the Polisario Front. Muhayshi was murdered in January 1984 under torture by Sa'eed Rashid according to Abdel Rahman Shalgham. In another account, he was allegedly stomped to death on the airport runway as soon as he landed in Tripoli.

See also

History of Libya under Muammar Gaddafi

Notes

References
Mohamed Yousef el-Magariaf (2008). Libia men al Shar’iya ad Dustouriya elal Shar’iya ath Thawriya. Dar al Istiqlal & Maktabat Wahba, Cairo.
Al Wasat magazine, London.

1941 births
1984 deaths
Libyan people of Circassian descent
Libyan people of Turkish descent
Libyan Arab Socialist Union politicians
Libyan military personnel
People extradited to Libya
Libyan torture victims
Libyan people who died in prison custody
Prisoners who died in Libyan detention
Libyan murder victims
People murdered in Libya
People extradited from Morocco
Deaths by beating
1984 crimes in Libya
1984 murders in Libya
Assassinated Libyan politicians
Assassinations in Libya